The Motor Vessel Tecam Sea is a bulk carrier built in 1984. The ship was built by Hitachi Zosen shipyard in Innoshima, Japan, and purchased by Sea Quality, a shipping company based in Athens, Greece. The ship was involved in a collision with the M/V Federal Fuji in the port of Sorel, Quebec on 27 April 2000. The squat effect phenomenon is believed to be a factor in the collision.

The Tecam Sea, under Panamanian ownership, was involved in illegal oil-waste dumping off the Canadian coast on 8 Sept 2002, resulting in eight serious pollution charges. Due to improper handling of the case by authorities, the case was dismissed and charges were dropped.

References

1984 ships
Ships built by Hitachi Zosen Corporation
Bulk carriers